Cody Austin Deal (born February 14, 1986) is an American actor in film and television. He is best known for his role as Thor in the Syfy Original Movie Almighty Thor. He starred alongside Richard Grieco, Patricia Velasquez, and Kevin Nash.

Bio 

He is the son of Diane Boulanger and has a twin brother named Kyle and an older brother named Lucas. Deal grew up in Sedan, Kansas and is Osage.

Filmography

Film

Television

References

External links

Osage people
American male film actors
American male television actors
Living people
People from Norman, Oklahoma
1986 births
American twins
Basketball players from Kansas
American men's basketball players
Male actors from Kansas
People from Sedan, Kansas
Male actors from Oklahoma
Male models from Oklahoma